is a professional Japanese baseball player. He plays pitcher for the Saitama Seibu Lions. He previously played in NPB for the Yomiuri Giants and Hokkaido Nippon-Ham Fighters.

Professional career

Yomiuri Giants

On October 25, 2012, Kumon was drafted by the Yomiuri Giants in the 2012 Nippon Professional Baseball draft.

On September 25, 2013, he made his debut as a relief pitcher in the Central League against the Tokyo Yakult Swallows.

In 2013 - 2016 season, Kumon pitched 15 games in the Central League.

Hokkaido Nippon-Ham Fighters
On November 2, 2016, Kumon and Taishi Ohta was traded to the Hokkaido Nippon-Ham Fighters in exchange for Mitsuo Yoshikawa and Shingo Ishikawa.

In 2017 season, he finished the regular season with a 41 Games pitched, a 3–0 Win–loss record, a 2.70 ERA, a 3 Holds, a 33 strikeouts in 36.2 innings.

In 2018 season, he finished the regular season with a 57 Games pitched, a 2–0 Win–loss record, a 2.17 ERA, a 11 Holds, a 52 strikeouts in 54.0 innings.

On August 29, 2019, Kumon broke the NPB record for undefeated pitchers in 165 games. In 2019 season, he finished the regular season with a 61 Games pitched, a 2–0 Win–loss record, a 3.96 ERA, a 17 Holds, a one Save, a 31 strikeouts in 52.1 innings.

In 2020 season, he finished the regular season with a 29 Games pitched, a 0–2 Win–loss record, a 7.88 ERA, a 8 Holds, a one Save, a 19 strikeouts in 24.0 innings.

Saitama Seibu Lions
On August 12, 2021, Kumon and Shota Hiranuma was traded to the Saitama Seibu Lions in exchange for Fumikazu Kimura and Ryusei Satoh.

References

External links

 Career statistics - NPB.jp

1992 births
Living people
Baseball people from Kōchi Prefecture
Hokkaido Nippon-Ham Fighters players
Japanese baseball players
Nippon Professional Baseball pitchers
Saitama Seibu Lions players
Yomiuri Giants players